South Gnadenthal is a hamlet in Coulee Rural Municipality No. 136, Saskatchewan, Canada. The hamlet is located on Highway 721, about 35 km southeast of Swift Current.

See also

 List of communities in Saskatchewan
 Hamlets of Saskatchewan

References

Unincorporated communities in Saskatchewan
Coulee No. 136, Saskatchewan